Sidnekoppa is a village in the Koppal district in Karnataka state, India.

Demographics
Per the 2011 Census of India, Sidnekoppa has a total population of 1136; of whom 607 are male and 529 female.

See also
Bannikoppa
Mannapura
Sompura
Malekoppa
Tondihal

References

Villages in Koppal district